Paracantha australis is a species of tephritid or fruit flies in the genus Paracantha of the family Tephritidae.

Distribution
Argentina, Uruguay.

References

Tephritinae
Insects described in 1933
Diptera of South America